St Thomas' Church is in the village of Milnthorpe, Cumbria, England.  It is an active Anglican parish church in the deanery of Kendal, the archdeaconry of Westmorland and Furness, and the diocese of Carlisle.

History

The church was built in 1835–37 to a design by the Kendal architect George Webster, providing accommodation for a congregation of 600.  The chancel was added in 1883 by Joseph Bintley.  In 1912 the Lancaster architects Austin and Paley carried out alterations at the west end of the church.  The west gallery was removed in 1982 and the church was sub-divided by a wall.

Architecture

St Thomas' is constructed in limestone with sandstone dressings.  The church has a nave, a chancel, and a west tower.  The nave contains paired lancet windows and has thin buttresses.  The chancel is in Early English style.  Many of the windows contain stained glass; these include two by F. Barrow of Milnthorpe dated 1872 and 1885, two by A. Burrow dated 1886 and 1890, and others by Heaton, Butler and Bayne (1879), Shrigley and Hunt (1898), and Abbott and Company (1928).  There is a ring of six bells, cast in 1912 by John Taylor & Co of Loughborough.

See also

List of works by George Webster
List of ecclesiastical works by Austin and Paley (1895–1914)

References

External links
Visit Cumbria: with photographs of the church

Church of England church buildings in Cumbria
Diocese of Carlisle
Gothic Revival church buildings in England
Gothic Revival architecture in Cumbria
Austin and Paley buildings
George Webster church buildings
St Thomas' Church